Weightlifting was part of the 2021 National Games of China held in Shaanxi. Men and women competed in fourteen weight classes which were also contested at the 2020 Tokyo Olympic Games

The competition program at the National Games mirrors that of the Olympic Games as only medals for the total achieved are awarded, but not for individual lifts in either the snatch or clean and jerk. Likewise an athlete failing to register a snatch result cannot advance to the clean and jerk.

Men

Women

External links 

 中华人民共和国第十四届运动会信息发布系统 Results of the 14th National Games of China 
 Weightlifting Results Book 

National Games of China
2021 in Chinese sport
2021
Weightlifting